Capys stuarti, the Kaduna protea playboy, is a butterfly in the family Lycaenidae. It is found in Nigeria. The habitat consists of lowland Guinea savanna.

Adults are on wing in February.

The larvae feed on Protea madiensis.

References

Endemic fauna of Nigeria
Butterflies described in 2000
Capys (butterfly)